La Belle Alliance Cemetery is a Commonwealth War Graves Commission burial ground for the dead of the First World War located near Ypres (Ieper) in Belgium on the Western Front.

The cemetery grounds were assigned to the United Kingdom in perpetuity by King Albert I of Belgium in recognition of the sacrifices made by the British Empire in the defence and liberation of Belgium during the war.

Foundation

The cemetery, named after a nearby farmhouse, was established by the 10th and 11th King's Royal Rifle Corps in February 1916. It was used until March, then opened again in July 1917. It closed in August of that year.

The cemetery was designed by J R Truelove.

References

External links
 
 

Commonwealth War Graves Commission cemeteries in Belgium
Cemeteries and memorials in West Flanders